KGMI (790 AM) is a commercial radio station licensed to Bellingham, Washington.  The station is owned and operated by Saga Broadcasting, dba Cascade Radio Group.  It airs a news/talk radio format.

KGMI serves Northwest Washington with a signal that reaches into much of Southwestern British Columbia, including Greater Vancouver and Victoria. The signal also reaches into Seattle's northern suburbs, as well as the Olympic Peninsula.  Its transmitter is off Yew Street Road in Bellingham.

By day, the station transmits with 5,000 watts. To protect other stations on AM 790, it reduces power at night to 1,000 watts and uses a directional antenna after sunset.  Programming is also heard on a 250-watt FM translator station, K243BX, on 96.5 MHz.

Programming
Weekdays begin with a local news and information show, the KGMI Morning News, featuring Dianna Hawryluk.  There is also a news hour during afternoon drive time, anchored by Joe Teehan.  Teehan also hosts KGMI Konnects, a live call-in show, ahead of the evening news hour.  The rest of the weekday schedule is made up of syndicated talk programs, including Hugh Hewitt, Lars Larson, Dennis Prager, John Batchelor, "Red Eye Radio," and "Coast To Coast AM."

Weekends feature shows on money, health, gardening, farming, car repair, home repair, real estate and technology, some of which are paid brokered programming.  Weekend syndicated shows include Kim Komando and Sebastian Gorka.  Most hours begin CBS Radio News.

History
KGMI signed on in 1926 from Seattle using the call sign KVOS, owned by Lou Kessler.  It moved to Bellingham a year later.  In 1928, Aberdeen businessman Rogan Jones bought the station.

In 1933, Jones began airing news bulletins from the Associated Press under the moniker "Newspaper of the Air."  The AP obtained a restraining order, but federal judge John Clyde Bowen refused to grant a permanent injunction, saying that news reports belong to the public.  Bowen's decision was reversed on appeal, prompting Jones to appeal to the Supreme Court.  In 1936, the Supreme Court threw out the restraining order on the grounds that since the AP was a nonprofit organization, it couldn't incur damages.  The case established that radio (and later, television) stations had the same right to news reports as newspapers.

The station broadcast on several different frequencies during its early years.  In 1935, it was located at AM 1200, powered at 100 watts, the only radio station between Everett and Vancouver.  In 1941, the North American Regional Broadcasting Agreement (NARBA) established new frequencies for many of the early radio stations.  KVOS moved to its current location at AM 790, powered at 250 watts.

In 1953, Jones signed on the area's first television station, KVOS-TV.  He sold it in 1962, but kept the radio station. Due to FCC rules at the time regarding separately owned stations not sharing the same call letters, the TV station remained KVOS-TV, while the radio station changed its call sign to the current KGMI.  In March 1960, Jones added an FM station at 92.9 MHz, KGMI-FM, which is now KISM.

Jones remained the owner until his death in 1972.  In 1998, Saga Communications purchased KGMI and KISM for $9.8 million.

References

External links

FCC History Cards for KGMI

GMI
News and talk radio stations in the United States
Radio stations established in 1926
1926 establishments in Washington (state)